Barry Dodson was an American stock car crew chief. He was the crew chief for Rusty Wallace's 1989 NASCAR Winston Cup Series championship for Blue Max Racing. He pitted for several drivers won a combined 19 Cup races.

Racing career
Dodson began racing in $99 claim races at Bowman Gray Stadium. He then worked six years for Petty Enterprises in the Grand National Series (now NASCAR Xfinity Series). Dodson was hired by W. C. Anderson in 1979 to work on Benny Parsons' team before switching to Anderson's other driver Cale Yarborough. He left with Yarborough in 1983 and they joined Harry Ranier's team.

Dodson was a NASCAR crew chief for the first time in 1985. Driver Tim Richmond finished eleventh in points with 13 top ten and 3 top five finishes in 28 races.

Dodson moved to Blue Max Racing in 1986; Rusty Wallace won two races that season and finished sixth in points. In 1987, Wallace won twice and finished fifth in points. In 1988, Wallace won six times and finished second in points. Wallace won the 1989 championship after winning six races and four pole positions.  Dodson ran Wallace's pits for the final time in 1990. The team had two wins and finished sixth in points before disbanding. 

Dodson was hired by Sam McMahon on Team III Racing in 1991; the team has a variety of drivers. Dodson was hired by Bob Whitcomb in 1992 with driver Derrike Cope. 

Owner/Driver Darrell Waltrip hired Dodson in 1993 as his crew chief for his team. Dodson was the crew chief until after the fifteenth race of the 1994 season. Felix Sabates hired Dodson for the 1995 season and driver Kyle Petty recorded Dodson's final win as a Cup crew chief; the union lasted for the first 25 races.

Dodson was the crew chief in the NASCAR SuperTruck Series from 1995 until 1998 for Ultra Motorsports with owner Jim Smith. Ultra's driver Mike Bliss won six races in the period. Bliss finished in the top 10 season points for all four seasons. 

Wallace later hired Dodson as the general manager for his Xfinity Series team. Dodson's final truck crew chief race happened in 2007.

Personal life
Dodson grew up in Winston-Salem, North Carolina with Chocolate Myers and the two sat together at the grandstands of Bowman Gray Stadium in their youth. 

Dodson's 17-year-old son David Trey Dodson and 16-year-old daughter Tia Jan Dodson were killed in an automobile accident in 1994. Their mother, Jan Kirkman Dodson, had been Barry Dodson's estranged wife. Dodson's step-son Trent Owens has also been a NASCAR crew chief.

Death
Dodson died in Winston-Salem, North Carolina at age 64 after a brief illness on December 20, 2017.

References

External links
 

1971 births
2017 deaths
NASCAR crew chiefs
Sportspeople from Winston-Salem, North Carolina